An oil burner is a heating device which burns #1, #2 and #6 heating oils, diesel fuel or other similar fuels. In the United States ultra low #2 diesel is the common fuel used.  It is dyed red to show that it is road-tax exempt.  In most markets of the United States heating oil is the same specification of fuel as on-road un-dyed diesel.

An oil burner is a part attached to an oil furnace, water heater, or boiler.  It provides the ignition of heating oil/biodiesel fuel used to heat either air or water via a heat exchanger.  The fuel is atomized into a fine spray usually by forcing it under pressure through a nozzle which gives the resulting flame a specific flow rate, angle of spray and pattern (variations of a cone shape). This spray is usually ignited by an electric spark with the air being forced through around it at the end of a blast tube, by a fan driven by the oil burner motor. The fuel pump is typically driven via a coupling connecting its shaft to that of the motor's. Oil burners also include combustion-proving devices to prevent out-of-control combustion - Primary Control; Safety Control; Cad Cell Control; Master Control; Fire-Eye Control are all common names for the 'combustion safety control'.

In the United States residential home heating oil market the "vaporizing gun burner" is the most common mechanical device used to heat a home or small commercial forced air space with. Depending on the manufacturer these simple burners will see a lifespan if regularly maintained for decades.  Currently, old installations from the 1950s and 1960s are still in operation today if they received regular maintenance.

The maintenance involved in a gun burner usually is a replacement of the nozzle used to atomize the fuel, replacing the filter located at the air handler, replacing the fuel filter on the heating oil system from the tank, cleaning out any soot or deposits in the heat exchanger of the furnace, and ensuring the system is in good working order, and also involves checking and adjusting the fuel-air mixture for efficiency with a combustion analyzer.

If a heating oil burner runs out of oil it often must be primed to be restarted. Priming involves purging any air from the fuel lines so that a steady flow of oil can find its way to the burner.

If an oil burner wears out it can usually be upgraded and replaced with a more efficient modern burner. If the heat exchanger wears out that requires a new furnace. Oil furnaces will last nearly forever if maintained regularly ensuring the heat exchanger is vacuumed out and cleaned. Oil burners deposit soot in the heat exchanger which is an un-even insulator. The heat distribution in the heat exchanger is un-even, causing wear on this critical steel part causing an eventual cracking. Annual or every other year tune-ups guarantee this wear is far reduced. Oil furnace lifespans of fifty to seventy-five years with regular service are not uncommon compared to an average wear out of natural gas furnaces every twenty years.

Fuel injection

Fuel is injected into the combustion chamber by a spray nozzle.

The nozzles are usually supplied with high pressure oil. Because erosion from friction with the oil, and possible blockage due to lumps in it, they need replacement when worn. Fuel nozzles are usually rated in fuel volume flow per unit time e.g. USGal/h (U.S. Gallons per hour).

A fuel nozzle is characterized by three features:
 Flow at 100psi pump pressure (e.g. 0.65 USGal/h)
 Spray characteristic (e.g. "S")
 Spray angle (e.g. 60 °)

Alternatively fuel may be passed over a tiny orifice fed with compressed air. This arrangement is referred to as Babington atomiser/nozzle, named after its inventor Robert Babington. As the oil flows over the nozzle, the fuel needn't be under any great pressure. If the pump can handle such the oil may even contain lumps such as scraps of food. Because it is only compressed air that passes through the orifice hole, such nozzles do not suffer much from erosion.

Oil pump 

A gear pump of two parts:

Gear pump assembly
This pumps the oil in and increases the pressure in the nozzles to 15 bar maximum (217.5 psi). Usually a gerotor of the sickle type is used. Gear pumps are used frequently in oil burners because of their simplicity, stability and low price.

Pressure regulator
To set the heat output of the burner, the rate of fuel delivery via the nozzle must be adjustable. This is often achieved by an adjustable pressure relief valve between the pump and the nozzle. When the set pressure is reached (usually 100psi), this valve opens and allows excess oil to flow through a bypass back to the fuel tank or the pump suction side.

Electromagnetic valve 

This allows fuel to be shut off from the sprayer by electrical control. It helps avoid drips when the valve is closed. It also eases the purging of the burner (and any boiler) of fuel mist during startup, or while restarting after a misfire. If the burner were not purged the oil/air mixture could explode.

Fan 
The fan blows air into the combustion chamber. The rotor of the fan is powered by an electric motor.

Igniters
Some oil burners use glow bars which operate much like the glow plugs of a diesel engine.

Many use high voltage generated by a voltage-step up transformer to create a spark for ignition, somewhat similar to a spark plug.

Original oil burner transformers were copper wire conductors wrapped around an iron core. A standard type of transformer to this day. In the mid-90s electronic igniters replaced the copper and iron transformer, solving many problems related to the old style transformer. This new technology in igniters would soon replace all old style transformers throughout the oil burner industry. The new igniters would run cooler so the output voltage could be increased from 10,000 to 20,000 VAC.

This increase of voltage would be more reliable, reduce delayed ignition, run cooler and all while using less energy. The voltage is high, but a standard igniter will only pull around 35 milliamps.

Safety control

Oil-fired burners are fitted with a safety mechanism for determining if the fuel has ignited and a flame present.  The terms "primary control", "safety control", "cad cell control", "master control", and "fire-eye control" are variously used to describe a light dependent electrical resistor (LDR) which detects the flame whose value changes by the amount of light it is exposed to. The resistance decreases as the LDR is exposed to more light. The material is usually cadmium sulfide, hence the name "cad cell" for this component. In darkness the resistance is around 1 MΩ, while when exposed to light from a properly ignited flame the resistance is significantly lower, around 75–300 Ω.

Older oil burners were equipped with a primary control installed on the exhaust stack with a bimetallic heat sensing element protruding into the stack, such a control was referred to as a "stack relay" or a "stack control". It performed the same function as the newer cad-cell control but instead of sensing light from the burner flame it sensed heat from the flame exhaust gases to prove that ignition took place.

Capacitor start motor 

The motor which drives the fan and the oil pump is usually a 
capacitor start motor. It is a single phase, squirrel cage induction motor. The difference with a three-phase motor is in the stator. Where the three phase motor has three coils aligned at 120° in the stator, the capacitor start motor holds one main winding and one auxiliary winding aligned at 90°. The phase shift of 90° between the main winding and the auxiliary winding is achieved by a connected capacitor which feeds the auxiliary winding and is connected on the single-phase AC mains. The capacitor will achieve a phase shift of 90° between the main and the auxiliary winding, producing an acceptable initial torque. This motor is intended for continuous operation.

See also
 Boiler
 Central heating
 Coal burner
 Flame lift-off
 Gas burner
 Heater
 Heating oil
 Kerosene lamp
 LO-NOx burner
 Passive house
 Portable stove
 Rayburn Range

References

Burners
Fireplaces
Residential heating appliances